Pegasus is an air-launched launch vehicle developed by Orbital Sciences Corporation (OSC) and now built and launched by Northrop Grumman. Pegasus is the world's first privately developed orbital launch vehicle. Capable of carrying small payloads of up to  into low Earth orbit, Pegasus first flew in 1990 and remains active . The vehicle consists of three solid propellant stages and an optional monopropellant fourth stage. Notably, the first stage does not have a thrust vector control (TVC) system.

History 
Pegasus was designed by a team led by Antonio Elias. The Pegasus's three Orion solid motors were developed by Hercules Aerospace (later Alliant Techsystems) specifically for the Pegasus launcher but using advanced carbon fiber, propellant formulation and case insulation technologies originally developed for the terminated USAF Small ICBM program. The wing and fins' structures were designed by Burt Rutan and his company, Scaled Composites, which manufactured them for Orbital.

 Mass: 18,500 kg (Pegasus), 23,130 kg (Pegasus XL) 
 Length: 16.9 m (Pegasus), 17.6 m (Pegasus XL) 
 Diameter: 1.27 m
 Wing span: 6.7 m
 Payload: 443 kg (1.18 m diameter, 2.13 m length)

Started in the spring of 1987, the development project was funded by Orbital Sciences Corporation and Hercules Aerospace, and did not receive any government funding. Government funding was received to support operational testing. NASA did provide the use of the B-52 carrier aircraft on a cost-reimbursable basis during the development (captive carry tests) and the first few flights. Two Orbital internal projects, the Orbcomm communications constellation and the OrbView observation satellites, served as anchor customers to help justify the private funding.

There were no Pegasus test launches prior to the first operational launch on 5 April 1990 with NASA test pilot and former astronaut Gordon Fullerton in command of the carrier aircraft. Initially, a NASA-owned B-52 Stratofortress NB-008 served as the carrier aircraft. By 1994, Orbital had transitioned to their "Stargazer" L-1011, a converted airliner which was formerly owned by Air Canada. The name "Stargazer" is an homage to the television series Star Trek: The Next Generation: the character Jean-Luc Picard was captain of a ship named Stargazer prior to the events of the series, and his first officer William Riker once served aboard a ship named Pegasus.

During its 45-launch history, the Pegasus program had three mission failures (STEP-1, STEP-2 and HETI/SAC-B), and two partial failures, (USAF Microsat and STEP-2) followed by 30 consecutive successful flights for a total program success rate of 89 percent. The first partial failure on 17 July 1991 caused the seven USAF microsatellites to be delivered to a lower than planned orbit, significantly reducing the mission lifetime. The last mission failure on 4 November 1996 resulted in the loss of gamma-burst identifying satellite HETE (High Energy Transient Explorer) in 1996.

The Pegasus XL, introduced in 1994  has lengthened stages to increase payload performance. In the Pegasus XL, the first and second stages are lengthened into the Orion 50SXL and Orion 50XL, respectively. Higher stages are unchanged; flight operations are similar. The wing is strengthened slightly to handle the higher weight. The standard Pegasus has been discontinued; the Pegasus XL is still active as of 2019. Pegasus has flown 44 missions in both configurations, launching 91 satellites as of October 12, 2019.

Dual payloads can be launched, with a canister that encloses the lower spacecraft and mounts the upper spacecraft. The upper spacecraft deploys, the canister opens, then the lower spacecraft separates from the third-stage adapter. Since the fairing is unchanged for cost and aerodynamic reasons, each of the two payloads must be relatively compact.  Other multiple-satellite launches involve "self-stacking" configurations, such as the ORBCOMM spacecraft.

For their work in developing the rocket, the Pegasus team led by Antonio Elias was awarded the 1991 National Medal of Technology by U.S. President George H. W. Bush.

The initial launch price offered was US$6 million, without options or a HAPS (Hydrazine Auxiliary Propulsion System) maneuvering stage. With the enlargement to Pegasus XL and the associated improvements to the vehicle, baseline prices increased. In addition, customers usually purchase additional services, such as extra testing, design and analysis, and launch-site support.

As of 2015, the most recent Pegasus XL to be purchased — a planned June 2017 launch of NASA's Ionospheric Connection Explorer (ICON) mission — had a total cost of US$56.3 million, which NASA notes includes "firm-fixed launch service costs, spacecraft processing, payload integration, tracking, data and telemetry and other launch support requirements". A series of technical problems delayed this launch, which finally took place on 11 October 2019.

In July 2019, it was announced that Northrop Grumman had lost the launch contract of the Imaging X-ray Polarimetry Explorer (IXPE) satellite to SpaceX. IXPE had been planned to be launched by a Pegasus XL rocket, and had been designed so as to fit within the Pegasus XL rocket constraints. With the IXPE launch removed from the Pegasus XL rocket, there are currently (as of 12 October 2019, after the launch of ICON) no space launch missions announced for the Pegasus XL rocket. The future (under construction as of 2019) NASA Explorer program mission Polarimeter to Unify the Corona and Heliosphere (PUNCH) was planned to be launched by Pegasus XL; but then NASA decided to merge the launches of PUNCH and another Explorer mission, Tandem Reconnection and Cusp Electrodynamics Reconnaissance Satellites (TRACERS) (also under construction as of 2019). These two space missions, consisting of 6 satellites in total, are to be launched by one launch vehicle. It is expected that a larger launcher will be chosen for this dual mission launch.

Northrop has two Pegasus XL's remaining in its inventory. It is looking for customers for those rockets. Northrop does not plan on retiring the Pegasus XL rocket as of October 2019.

Launch profile 

In a Pegasus launch, the carrier aircraft takes off from a runway with support and checkout facilities. Such locations have included Kennedy Space Center / Cape Canaveral Air Force Station, Florida; Vandenberg Air Force Base and Dryden Flight Research Center, California; Wallops Flight Facility, Virginia; Kwajalein Range in the Pacific Ocean, and the Canary Islands in the Atlantic Ocean. Orbital offers launches from Alcantara, Brazil, but no known customers have performed any.

Upon reaching a predetermined staging time, location, and velocity the aircraft releases the Pegasus. After five seconds of free-fall, the first stage ignites and the vehicle pitches up. The 45-degree delta wing (of carbon composite construction and double-wedge airfoil) aids pitch-up and provides some lift. The tail fins provide steering for first-stage flight, as the Orion 50S motor does not have a thrust-vectoring nozzle.

Approximately 1 minute and 17 seconds later, the Orion 50S motor burns out. The vehicle is at over 200,000 feet (61 km) in altitude and hypersonic speed. The first stage falls away, taking the wing and tail surfaces, and the second stage ignites. The Orion 50 burns for approximately 1 minute and 18 seconds. Attitude control is by thrust vectoring the Orion 50 motor around two axes, pitch and yaw; roll control is provided by nitrogen thrusters on the third stage.

Midway through second-stage flight, the launcher has reached a near-vacuum altitude. The fairing splits and falls away, uncovering the payload and third stage. Upon burnout of the second-stage motor, the stack coasts until reaching a suitable point in its trajectory, depending on mission. Then the Orion 50 is discarded, and the third stage's Orion 38 motor ignites. It too has a thrust-vectoring nozzle, assisted by the nitrogen thrusters for roll. After approximately 64 seconds, the third stage burns out.

A fourth stage is sometimes added for a higher altitude, finer altitude accuracy, or more complex maneuvers. The HAPS (Hydrazine Auxiliary Propulsion System) is powered by three restartable, monopropellant hydrazine thrusters. As with dual launches, the HAPS cuts into the fixed volume available for payload. In at least one instance, the spacecraft was built around the HAPS.

Guidance is via a 32-bit computer and an IMU. A GPS receiver gives additional information. Due to the air launch and wing lift, the first-stage flight algorithm is custom-designed. The second- and third-stage trajectories are ballistic, and their guidance is derived from a Space Shuttle algorithm.

Carrier aircraft 

The carrier aircraft (initially a NASA B-52, now an L-1011 owned by Northrop Grumman) serves as a booster to increase payloads at reduced cost.  is only about 4% of a low Earth orbital altitude, and the subsonic aircraft reaches only about 3% of orbital velocity, yet by delivering the launch vehicle to this speed and altitude, the reusable aircraft replaces a costly first-stage booster.

In October 2016, Orbital ATK announced a partnership with Stratolaunch Systems to launch Pegasus-XL rockets from the giant Scaled Composites Stratolaunch, which could launch up to three Pegasus-XL rockets on a single flight.

Related projects 

Pegasus components have also been the basis of other Orbital Sciences Corporation launchers. The ground-launched Taurus rocket places the Pegasus stages and a larger fairing atop a Castor 120 first stage, derived from the first stage of the MX Peacekeeper missile. Initial launches used refurbished MX first stages.

The Minotaur I, also ground-launched, is a combination of stages from Taurus launchers and Minuteman missiles, hence the name. The first two stages are from a Minuteman II; the upper stages are Orion 50XL and 38. Due to the use of surplus military rocket motors, it is only used for U.S. Government and government-sponsored payloads.

A third vehicle is dubbed Minotaur IV despite containing no Minuteman stages. It consists of a refurbished MX with an Orion 38 added as a fourth stage.

The NASA X-43A hypersonic test vehicles were boosted by Pegasus first stages. The upper stages were replaced by exposed models of a scramjet-powered vehicle. The Orion stages boosted the X-43 to its ignition speed and altitude, and were discarded. After firing the scramjet and gathering flight data, the test vehicles also fell into the Pacific.

The most numerous derivative of Pegasus is the booster for the Ground-based Midcourse Defense (GBMD) interceptor, basically a vertical (silo) launched Pegasus minus wing and fins, and with the first stage modified by addition of a Thrust Vector Control (TVC) system.

Launch statistics

Rocket configurations

Launch sites

Launch outcomes

Carrier airplane

Launch history 
Pegasus has flown 45 missions between 1990 and 2021.

Planned launches

Launch failures 
 Flight F-6, 27 June 1994: The vehicle lost control 35 seconds into flight, telemetry downlink lost 38 seconds into flight, range safety commanded flight termination 39 seconds into flight. The likely reason for loss of control was improper aerodynamic modelling of the longer (XL) version of which this was the first flight. The Pegasus carried the DoD Space Test Program's satellite - Space Test Experiments Platform, Mission 1 (STEP-1).

 Flight F-9, 22 June 1995: The interstage ring between the 1st and 2nd stages did not separate, constraining movement of the 2nd-stage nozzle. As a result, the rocket deviated from its intended trajectory and was ultimately destroyed by range safety. The Pegasus carried the DoD Space Test Program's satellite - Space Test Experiments Platform, Mission 3 (STEP-3).

 Flight F-14, 4 November 1996: Failed to separate payloads because of a discharged battery intended to start separation pyros. Battery damage during launch was the likely reason. The lost payloads were the High Energy Transient Explorer and Argentina's SAC-B satellite.

Partial successes 
 Flight F-2, 17 July 1991: A faulty pyrotechnic system caused the rocket to veer off course during 1st-stage separation, resulting erratic maneuvers that prevented the rocket reaching the correct orbit, and the mission life, planned for 3 years, was reduced to 6 months.

 Flight F-5, 19 May 1994: A software navigation error caused the HAPS upper stage to shut down early, resulting in a lower than planned orbit. The Pegasus carried the DoD Space Test Program's satellite - Space Test Experiments Platform, Mission 2 (STEP-2).

See also 

 Air launch to orbit
 Comparison of orbital launchers families
 Comparison of orbital launch systems
 Pegasus II (rocket)

References

External links 

 Pegasus/ICON website at Northrop Grumman
 Pegasus at Encyclopedia Astronautica
 The Pegasus XL Rocket

Air launch to orbit
Solid-fuel rockets
Northrop Grumman space launch vehicles
Orbital Sciences Corporation space launch vehicles
Vehicles introduced in 1990
Expendable space launch systems